Francis Peter Cusack (4 February 1919–14 December 1990) was a New Zealand labourer and character. He was born in Winton, Southland, New Zealand on 4 February 1919.

References

1919 births
1990 deaths
Burials at Eastern Cemetery, Invercargill
People from Winton, New Zealand